Here and Gone is an album by David Sanborn released in 2008 on Decca Records. It features guest stars such as Derek Trucks, Eric Clapton, Joss Stone and Sam Moore.

Track listing 
 "St. Louis Blues" (W.C. Handy) - 5:19
 "Brother Ray" (Marcus Miller) - 5:39; featuring Derek Trucks
 "I'm Gonna Move to the Outskirts of Town" (Casey Bill Weldon, Roy Jordan) - 4:47; featuring Eric Clapton
 "Basin Street Blues" (Spencer Williams) - 4:54
 "Stoney Lonesome" (Hank Crawford) - 4:08
 "I Believe to My Soul" (Ray Charles) - 4:30; featuring Joss Stone
 "What Will I Tell My Heart?" (Irving Gordon, Jack Lawrence, Peter Tinturin) - 4:47
 "Please Send Me Someone to Love" (Percy Mayfield) - 3:21
 "I've Got News for You" (Roy Alfred) - 4:27; featuring Sam Moore

Personnel 
 David Sanborn – alto saxophone 
 Gil Goldstein – Rhodes piano (1, 4, 6, 8), Wurlitzer electric piano (2), Hammond B3 organ (3)
 Ricky Peterson – Hammond B3 organ (2, 6, 8, 9)
 Russell Malone – guitar 
 Derek Trucks – guitar (2)
 Eric Clapton – guitar (3)
 Christian McBride – bass
 Steve Gadd – drums
 Howard Johnson – baritone saxophone 
 Lou Marini – tenor saxophone 
 Michael Davis – tenor trombone
 Keyon Harrold – trumpet 
 Wallace Roney – trumpet (1)
 Lew Soloff – trumpet (1, 4, 6, 9)
 Charles Pillow – bass clarinet (1-4, 6, 9
 John Moses – bass clarinet (5, 7, 8)
 Joss Stone – vocals (6)
 Sam Moore – vocals (9)

Production 
 Phil Ramone – producer 
 Joe Ferla – recording, mixing 
 Lawrence Manchester – additional engineer
 Michael C. Ross – additional engineer
 Bobby Tis – additional engineer
 Missy Webb – mix assistant 
 Dean Sharenow – ProTools programming and engineer 
 Hyomin Kang – ProTools operator
 Steve Rodby – additional ProTools engineer
 Greg Calbi – mastering 
 Dave Novik – A&R 
 Evelyn Morgan – A&R administration 
 Paul Altomari – A&R coordinator 
 Dave Novik – A&R 
 Evelyn Morgan – A&R administration 
 Paul Altomari – A&R coordinator 
 Jill Dell'Abate – production manager, music contractor 
 Tom Arndt – package coordination
 Leif Covington – package coordination
 Garrett Shelton – release coordination
 Fanny Gotschall – creative direction 
 Rebecca Meek – design 
 Joanne Savio – photography 
 Lynn Goldsmith – back and cover inlay photography 
 Sofia Garcia – stylist

Studios
 Recorded at Legacy Recording Studios and Hiatus Studios (New York City, New York); Studio 835 (Los Angeles, California)
 Mixed at Legacy Recording Studios 
 Mastered at Sterling Sound (New York City, New York).

External links
  Official David Sanborn website
 David Sanborn interview by Pete Lewis, 'Blues & Soul' September 2008

2008 albums
David Sanborn albums
Albums produced by Phil Ramone
Decca Records albums